Coleophora graeca is a moth of the family Coleophoridae. It is found in Greece.

References

graeca
Moths described in 1990
Moths of Europe